Georgia State Route 26 Connector may refer to:

 Georgia State Route 26 Connector (Garden City): A connecting route that exists completely in Garden City
 Georgia State Route 26 Connector (Hartford): A former connecting route that existed completely in Hartford
 Georgia State Route 26 Connector (Savannah): A former connecting route that existed completely in Savannah

026 Connector